William Walker Wood MBE (born 26 April 1938 in Haddington, East Lothian) is a former Scottish professional bowls player, who has mainly competed in the outdoor or lawn form of the game. He is regarded as one of the leading bowlers of his generation and his list of achievements include appearing at eight Commonwealth Games and winning two gold medals and eight World Bowls Championship gold medals.

Early life
Wood took up bowls at the age of 12, perhaps unsurprisingly as his father, grandfather and mother all played the sport. With little else to occupy his time, Wood says he elected to bowl in his home village of Gifford, rather than brave the bus journey to the swimming baths at nearby North Berwick.

Wood undertook his national service with the British Army, joining aged 18, serving in Germany with the Royal Electrical and Mechanical Engineers. He later ran his own garage before concentrating on bowls.

Bowls career

World Championships
Wood has won sixteen medals at the World Outdoor Bowls Championship including eight gold medals. He first won two medals at the 1980 World Outdoor Bowls Championship in Melbourne in the fours and team event (Leonard Trophy).

He competed in the finals of the 1984 and 1988 World Bowls Championship singles (held every four years), missing out by millimetres to Peter Belliss of New Zealand in 1984 on home soil in Aberdeen. He was back in the final four years later in Auckland, New Zealand but was beaten by England's David Bryant. He did however win team gold. During the 1988 World Outdoor Bowls Championship in Auckland he won two silver medals and four years later picked up two golds and one bronze at the 1992 World Outdoor Bowls Championship in Worthing.

Two further gold medals were added during the 1996 World Outdoor Bowls Championship in Adelaide and two bronze medals were won at the 2000 World Outdoor Bowls Championship in Johannesburg. On home turf in Ayr at the 2004 World Outdoor Bowls Championship he won two golds. Wood competed in nine World Championships in total and most recently a gold medal in the triples at the 2008 event in Christchurch, New Zealand.

Commonwealth Games
Wood first represented his country in 1966 and in 2002 became the first athlete to compete in a 7th Commonwealth Games. His Commonwealth Games career included a singles bronze in 1974, a silver in the pairs in 1978, individual gold in 1982 and a captain's role in the 1990 winning fours team. The feat is even more remarkable as, had internal politics not forced him out of the 1986 games (held, ironically, in Scotland), Wood could have competed in more. After refusing to be reclassified as an amateur, the Scotland team decided not to select the World Championship runner-up, denying him the chance to compete in Edinburgh, at a bowling green just metres from Tynecastle Park – home of his beloved Heart of Midlothian FC. In 2002, Wood was reported to be disappointed that Team Scotland athletes voted to give cyclist Craig MacLean the honour of carrying the flag at the opening ceremony, despite Wood's record-breaking achievement. Aged 72, Wood was included in Scotland's team for the 2010 Commonwealth Games, extending his record to an eighth games, and making him the oldest competitor at the games.

National & other
Wood also competed in over forty home international events and won the 2006 national pairs title for Gifford BC. In 1985 and 1986, he won the Hong Kong International Bowls Classic pairs titles.

Awards
In 2007, Wood became the first bowler to be inducted into the Scottish Sports Hall of Fame. Wood retired from international bowls in 2011, although he intends to continue to compete at national level. His final act as an outdoor internationalist was to help Scotland retain the Home Internationals Series for a recording breaking forty-second time. Woods retired with an impressive total of 134 outdoor caps to his name.

Wood was appointed a Member of the Order of the British Empire (MBE) for services to bowls in the 1992 Birthday Honours. He has also written an instructional book, A Bias to Bowls, which was published in 1990.

References

External links
Willie Wood's World Bowls and Commonwealth Games medals
List of British Commonwealth Games bowls medallists

1938 births
Living people
Scottish male bowls players
Commonwealth Games bronze medallists for Scotland
Commonwealth Games gold medallists for Scotland
Commonwealth Games silver medallists for Scotland
People from Haddington, East Lothian
Members of the Order of the British Empire
Bowls players at the 1974 British Commonwealth Games
Bowls players at the 1978 Commonwealth Games
Bowls players at the 1982 Commonwealth Games
Bowls players at the 1990 Commonwealth Games
Bowls players at the 1994 Commonwealth Games
Bowls players at the 1998 Commonwealth Games
Bowls players at the 2002 Commonwealth Games
Bowls players at the 2010 Commonwealth Games
Sportspeople from East Lothian
Commonwealth Games medallists in lawn bowls
Bowls World Champions
Medallists at the 1974 British Commonwealth Games
Medallists at the 1978 Commonwealth Games
Medallists at the 1982 Commonwealth Games
Medallists at the 1990 Commonwealth Games